The Vanua Tako Lavo Party was a strongly nationalistic political party in Fiji, which was led by Iliesa Duvuloco.  It advocated institutionalized political supremacy for indigenous Fijians.  In the late 1990s, it merged with Sakeasi Butadroka's Fijian Nationalist Party to form the Nationalist Vanua Tako Lavo Party, which won one seat in the general election of 1999.

Nationalist parties in Oceania
Defunct political parties in Fiji
Indigenist political parties in Oceania
Fijian nationalism
Political parties disestablished in 1999